Stephen T. Owens (born 1948) is a civil trial lawyer in Los Angeles, California with the law firm of Alvarez-Glasman & Colvin. Previously, Owens was a partner in the international law firms of Squire Patton Boggs and Graham & James LLP for approximately 39 years.  Owens has represented many major U.S., Japanese, Chinese and other international corporations and financial institutions, including Bridgestone Co., EchoStar/Dish Network, Suzuki Motor Corporation, Toyota Tsusho, China Airlines, Volaris Airlines, Mexicana Airlines, Union Bank, N.A., Bank of Tokyo/Mitsubishi-UFJ, and Knotts Berry Farm, as well as various governmental bodies, including the Federal Deposit Insurance Corporation, the Federal Savings and Loan Insurance Corporation, the Federal Home Loan Bank of San Francisco, the California cities of Los Angeles, Pomona, West Covina, Montebello,  Buena Park, Chico and Yountville, the County of San Bernardino, city councilmembers of various cities, and municipal redevelopment agencies.  In addition to his trial work in the fields of international trade, finance and real estate, he has acted as litigation counsel to a number of noteworthy individuals and companies in the entertainment and sports world, including LeBron James, Big Joe Turner and Rick James, and has defended several prominent law firms in malpractice actions.

Lawsuit against Marion Suge Knight 
He represented Afeni Shakur, the mother of Tupac Shakur, and the Estate of Tupac Shakur in a racketeering (civil RICO) lawsuit against Marion "Suge" Knight, Death Row Records and their attorney, David Kenner, which resulted in the Estate's recovery of the unreleased master tapes recorded by Tupac prior to his murder in 1996.  Afeni Shakur and Richard S. Fischbein, as Joint Administrators of the Estate of Tupac Shakur v. Death Row Records, Inc., Marion "Suge" Knight, and David Kenner, United States District Court for the Central District of California (1997).  The tracks on the recovered master tapes were released on the posthumous, quadruple platinum, double album entitled R U Still Down? (Remember Me) and on several later albums.  Owens also represented Afeni Shakur and the Estate of Tupac Shakur in a wrongful death lawsuit filed against Orlando Anderson, aka "Baby Lane", a reputed gang member from Compton, California with whom Tupac had fought at the MGM Grand Las Vegas just hours before he was murdered.  Afeni Shakur, et al. v. Orlando Anderson, et al., Superior Court of California for the County of Los Angeles, Case No. BC 177861.

Publicized case 
In another publicized case, Owens represented Internet Entertainment Group against Pamela Anderson's unsuccessful attempt to prevent the company from posting the so-called "honeymoon video" made by her and then-husband Tommy Lee on the internet.  Adopting the argument that the First Amendment to the U.S. Constitution generally bars courts from issuing a "prior restraint" on speech, the court denied Anderson's application for a temporary restraining order that would have barred, in advance, IEG's distribution of the video.  Pamela Anderson Lee and Tommy Lee v. Internet Entertainment Group, et al., Superior Court of California for the County of Los Angeles, Case No. BC 180801.  Immediately after the plaintiffs' application for a restraining order was denied, the video was widely distributed on the internet.

Owens has also represented, on a pro bono basis,  a number of elderly, low-income, African American homeowners victimized by home equity fraud schemes.  In one of those cases, the jury awarded the homeowner $1.3 million in damages against the dishonest mortgage loan broker and his associates.  The case was featured on the ABC television program "PrimeTime Live".  "'Primetime' Is the Right Time for a Lawyer", Los Angeles Daily Journal, July 22, 1992, p. 2; "$1.3 Million Awarded in House Scam", Los Angeles Times, April 4, 1992, p. B3; Henry v. Alcove Investment, Inc. (1991) 233 Cal. App. 3d 94; "The Elder Helper", California Lawyer, June 1992, p. 28.

In recognition of his pro bono work, Owens received the American Bar Association's John Minor Wisdom Award for Professionalism and Public Service in October 1993 and accepted the President's Pro Bono Service Award, conferred by the president of the State Bar of California, on behalf of the Graham & James Home Equity Fraud Team, a team of pro bono lawyers formed by Owens, in October 1992.
 
Owens has been designated a Southern California "Super Lawyer" in the field of business litigation in every February issue of Los Angeles magazine from 2004 through 2022.  He has served on numerous boards and commissions, including the California State Commission on Judicial Nominees Evaluation (1996–1998), the board of directors of Public Counsel, the public interest law firm sponsored by the Los Angeles County and Beverly Hills Bar Associations (1992–1995), and the board of directors of the Constitutional Rights Foundation, a non-profit educational foundation developing and providing teaching materials and programs regarding the U.S. Constitution and American democracy to junior high school and high school teachers in Southern California (2002–2004).

Awards 
 1992 – President's Pro Bono Service Award, State Bar of California
 1993 – John Minor Wisdom Award for Professionalism and Public Service, American Bar Association

References

External links
 http://www.martindale.com/Stephen-T-Owens/132600-lawyer.htm
 http://findarticles.com/p/articles/mi_m0EIN/is_20100322/ai_n52678191/?tag=content;col1
 http://www.businesswire.com/news/home/20100816005398/en/Santa-Clara-Superior-Court-Rules-Favor-PrediWave
 http://www.businesswire.com/news/home/20100907006979/en/Simpson-Thacher-Barlett-LLP-Fails-Shake-Damaging

Living people
California lawyers
1948 births
People associated with Squire Patton Boggs